"Goodbye, Farewell and Amen" is a television film that served as the series finale of the American television series M*A*S*H. Closing out the series' 11th season, the 2 1/2-hour episode first aired on CBS on February 28, 1983, ending the series' original run. The episode was written by eight collaborators, including series star Alan Alda, who also directed.

The episode's plot chronicles the final days of the Korean War at the 4077th MASH; it features several storylines intended to show the war's effects on the individual personnel of the unit and to bring closure to the series. After the ceasefire goes into effect, the members of the 4077th throw a party before taking down the camp for the last time. After tear-filled goodbyes, the main characters go their separate ways, leading to the final scene of the series.

Plot
The film begins with Hawkeye Pierce being treated at a psychiatric hospital by Sidney Freedman. It is revealed he suffered a nervous breakdown while working in the operating room. He tells Freedman about a recent beach outing by a busload of camp staff. They picked up some refugees and wounded soldiers on their return home. Forced to pull off the road to avoid an enemy patrol, Hawkeye remembers telling a refugee to keep her chicken quiet; in doing so the chicken was smothered and died. 

Conditions back at the 4077 are chaotic with the camp now home to large numbers of refugees and prisoners of war. A wounded tank driver demolishes the camp latrine and abandons the tank in the camp. Charles Winchester leaves camp to perform his ablutions and meets five Chinese soldiers on a motorcycle-sidecar combination eager to surrender. The men are revealed to be musicians and Winchester marches them to camp while they play Oh! Susanna. B.J. eagerly takes possession of the motorcycle while Winchester begins to teach the prisoners classical music. Despite a language barrier, the musicians recognize Mozart's name and learn to play Mozart's Clarinet Quintet. 

Margaret Houlihan and Winchester discuss their postwar careers. Houlihan is offered an Army administrative post while Winchester is disappointed to find his absence from Boston has let a less talented colleague take a coveted chief surgeon spot. Winchester receives a letter to the contrary, but becomes angry after learning from Klinger that Margaret had intervened in the selection process by having a relative pull strings.

Klinger falls in love with a refugee named Soon-Lee Han, who wants to return to the combat zone to find her missing parents. B.J. Hunnicutt receives repatriation orders and prepares to leave once Colonel Potter can get a replacement surgeon. The chaos in the camp is intensified by enemy mortar fire on the abandoned tank. Father Mulcahy loses his hearing while saving POWs under fire in their holding area. He swears B.J. to secrecy about the nature of his injury, afraid the Army will return him home, away from the local orphans he has tended throughout his time in Korea.

Hawkeye's treatment progresses and he reveals the woman on the bus had actually smothered her own baby. Hawkeye vents anger on Sidney for making him remember the true nature of the incident. Sidney explains it is necessary for his recovery and returns Hawkeye to duty. B.J. meanwhile is offered a chance to fly out in time for his daughter's birthday and leaves. Hawkeye returns to find B.J. left without a farewell, as Trapper John had earlier in the series. When the mortar fire intensifies, Hawkeye impulsively drives the tank into the camp garbage dump, prompting concern from the others. Sidney Freedman is asked to return to follow up. 

A nearby forest fire causes the camp to relocate. A helicopter bringing B.J.'s replacement arrives, and it is revealed to be Hunnicutt himself, who travelled to Guam before he was sent back to Korea. He celebrates his daughter's birthday at a party for orphaned refugee children. Hawkeye is unable to watch the party due to his experiences, and discusses his postwar future with Sidney, fearing he can no longer be around children. When Hawkeye finds he is able to operate on an injured young girl, Sidney leaves the 4077th with Hawkeye's thanks.

Charles's musicians leave camp as part of a prisoner exchange, playing Mozart Clarinet as they depart. The ceasefire is announced ending hostilities in the war. The 4077 returns to its camp site with wounded soldiers continuing to arrive in the last hours of the war. Winchester discovers one of the musicians has been brought in dead and that the others have been killed. Dazed, he returns to The Swamp and tries to listen to the Mozart recording he used to teach the musicians but finds it no longer brings him joy and smashes it in anger.

The camp personnel throw a final party and reveal their postwar plans. Klinger will marry Soon-Lee and ironically, given his attempts throughout the series to be sent home, remain in Korea. Mulcahy officiates at their wedding while the camp is dismantled. Camp staff say their goodbyes and leave in different ways. Winchester apologizes to Houlihan for his earlier poor treatment of her and gives her a signed book of her favorite poetry. Houlihan says goodbye to Potter and B.J. before Hawkeye steals a long kiss. Potter takes a final ride on the horse that was gifted to him earlier in the series before donating her to the orphanage. Hawkeye and B.J. give him a final parting gift, a heartfelt salute, which Potter tearfully returns.

In the final scene of the series, B.J. gives Hawkeye a ride to his chopper on the motorcycle. Just before the chopper takes off B.J. shouts that he left a note this time and then rides off. As the helicopter lifts off, Hawkeye sees the word GOODBYE spelled out with rocks on the helipad. He smiles as the chopper carries him away.

Cultural reaction and impact
The anticipation before the airing of "Goodbye, Farewell and Amen" was unprecedented, especially for a regular television series (in contrast to awards shows, sporting events, or special events). Interest from advertisers prompted CBS, the network broadcasting M*A*S*H, to sell 30-second commercial blocks for $450,000 (equal to $ today) each—costlier than even NBC's airing of the Super Bowl of that year.

On the night the episode aired, large areas of California (particularly the San Francisco Bay Area) suffered power outages due to unusually stormy winter weather, which prevented many viewers from watching the series finale. Three weeks later, on March 21, KPIX, the CBS affiliate in San Francisco, re-aired the episode.

Reaction and AfterMASH
In the United States, the episode drew 105.97 million total viewers and a total audience of 121.6 million, more than both Super Bowl XVII and the Roots miniseries. The episode surpassed the single-episode ratings record that had been set by the Dallas episode that resolved the "Who Shot J.R.?" cliffhanger. From 1983 until 2010, "Goodbye, Farewell and Amen" remained the most watched television broadcast in American history, passed only in total viewership (but not in ratings or share) in February 2010 by Super Bowl XLIV. As of 2010, it stands as the most-watched finale of any television series, as well as the most-watched episode as of 2018.

As M*A*S*H was one of the most successful shows in TV history, in order not to lose the franchise completely, CBS quickly created a new series, AfterMASH, that followed the postwar adventures of Colonel Potter, Max Klinger, and Father Mulcahy in a stateside veterans hospital. Despite wide popularity in its premiere episodes, script problems and constant character changes led to a sharp decline in viewers, and the show was canceled by CBS after only two seasons. Another would-be spin-off, W*A*L*T*E*R, was a pilot made in 1984 that was never picked up. It starred Gary Burghoff, who reprised his M*A*S*H character.

"Goodbye, Farewell and Amen" was not initially included in the syndication package for M*A*S*Hs final season; however, in 1992, the episode made its syndication premiere in time for its 10th anniversary. Local stations aired it as a part of a Movie of the Week.

"Goodbye, Farewell and Amen" was not the final show filmed, as the final season was filmed out of order. The final scene filmed for the series was the time capsule burial scene from "As Time Goes By".

The wildfire storyline was written into the show after a real wildfire destroyed most of the outdoor set, in October 1982. The scene was filmed less than 12 hours after the fire had ravaged the set, and several burned-out vehicles remain at the location to this day.

When "M*A*S*H" was shown on FX and Hallmark Channel, they aired "Goodbye, Farewell and Amen" occasionally. Hallmark Channel showed it twice a year, February and August, before dropping "M*A*S*H" from its schedule. TV Land and MeTV have also shown the episode sporadically, including Veterans Day broadcasts on November 11, 2015, November 11, 2019, November 11, 2020, November 11, 2021, and November 11, 2022. In Canada, the cable channel History Television shows the episode in its entirety annually on the Labour Day holiday.

In 2011, the TV Guide Network special "TV's Most Unforgettable Finales" ranked this finale as the best.

Because the final episode was filmed as a -hour movie, the producers counted it as 5 episodes in the season's production order to the network for broadcasting, for a total of 20 episodes in all.

See also

 List of most watched television broadcasts

Footnotes

External links

 

American television films
M*A*S*H (season 11) episodes
American television series finales
1983 television films
1983 films
1983 American television episodes
Television episodes directed by Alan Alda
Films with screenplays by Alan Alda
February 1983 events in the United States
Television episodes about weddings
1983 in American television
Fiction with unreliable narrators